Franz Kaspirek (30 March 1918 – 4 June 2008) was an Austrian football midfielder who played for Austria. He also played for SK Rapid Wien and Wiener Sport-Club.

External links

 
 

1918 births
2008 deaths
Austrian footballers
Austria international footballers
Association football midfielders
SK Rapid Wien players
Wiener Sport-Club players